The Balvano train disaster was the deadliest railway accident in Italian history and one of the worst railway disasters ever. It occurred on the night between 2–3 March 1944 in Balvano, Basilicata. Over 500 people in a steam-hauled, coal-burning freight train (mostly stowaways) died of carbon monoxide poisoning during a protracted stall in a tunnel.

Circumstances
In 1943, Axis Italy was invaded by British and American armed forces, and the southern part of the peninsula (almost fully conquered by Allied forces) suffered severe wartime shortages, encouraging an extensive black market. People in large cities like Naples began bartering fresh produce for commodities brought by servicemen, and stowed away on freight trains to reach their suppliers' farms.

The railway companies also suffered shortages of good-quality coal. The burning of low-grade substitutes developed a reduced power output and produced a large volume of carbon monoxide, an odorless and poisonous gas, a particularly severe problem in Italy's railway network, which crosses mostly mountainous land, and hence makes large use of tunnels with steep inclines of up to 3.5%.

In February 1944 this condition caused a first accident: the personnel of a US military train running in a tunnel on the Battipaglia–Metaponto railway was poisoned by poor-quality coal exhaust; one driver fainted, was crushed between the engine and the tender, and died. No action was taken to prevent the accident from happening again.

Accident

In the evening of 2 March 1944 the freight train 8017 started from Naples heading to Potenza. It consisted of 47 freight wagons and had a remarkable mass of 520 tonnes; it also carried many illegal passengers.

The first part of the journey took place on flat railway, and the train was pulled by a E.626 electric engine. At 19:00 the train left Battipaglia and entered the steeper, non-electrified Battipaglia–Metaponto railway; the electric engine had been replaced by two steam engines (the 480.016 followed by the 476.058).

In Eboli some stowaways were forced off, but more boarded on following stops until they numbered about 600, making the train grossly overloaded. At midnight the train arrived in the Balvano-Ricigliano station, the last one before the disaster, where it stopped for maintenance on the engines.

As the engines entered the tunnel, the wheels started to slide on the rails (which were wet due to humidity), despite the use of sand boxes, and the train lost speed until it stopped, with almost all the cars inside the tunnel.

The air was already filled with smoke since another train had passed shortly before, and the drivers' effort to restart the train caused the locomotives to produce even more carbon monoxideladen smoke. As a result, the crew and stowaways were asphyxiated, so slowly that they failed to realize what was happening to them. Most died in their sleep. Of the few survivors most were in the last few wagons, which were still in the open air.

At some point the driver of the 476 locomotive tried to engage the reverse gear in an attempt to exit the tunnel, but he fainted before succeeding. Moreover, he could not communicate with the driver of the other engine (which in fact continued to push in the forward direction) because the 476 was an Austrian-built engine with right-hand drive, while the 480 had left-hand drive as usual in Italian railways.

At 05:10 the Balvano station master learned of the disaster from last car's brakeman, who had walked back to the station. At 05:25 a locomotive reached the site but the many corpses on the track prevented it from removing the train from the tunnel; only some forty survivors in the last wagons could be assisted. At 08:40 a second rescue team arrived which hauled the train back to the station. Among the crew, only the one brakeman, and the second locomotive's fireman, survived.

Due to the large number of corpses, the wartime lack of resources, and the poverty of many of the victims, only the train staff received a proper burial; stowaways were buried without a religious service in four common graves at the Balvano cemetery.

Responsibility 

The accident was the result of many factors. The root cause was the lack of supervision by railway authorities, who tolerated so many stowaways riding on the train. Contributing factors were the low-quality coal, the lack of ventilation in the tunnel, the wet rails, and the fact that the train had a double heading instead of a push–pull configuration. The lack of coordination between the drivers of the two locomotives was the proximate cause. In addition, the death toll was aggravated by the delay in rescue efforts.

Despite this, the commission which inquired into the accident did not pursue those responsible, and considered it as caused by force majeure. At the time, the catastrophe was attributed mainly to:

The station masters of Balvano and Bella-Muro were blamed because they did not act to determine the location of the train when it appeared late on the roadmap. However, in the post-war confusion it was usual for communications to be irregular, and trains could be greatly delayed. It was not uncommon that it would take over two hours to travel the mountainous 7 km between the two stations.

The staff of the train and of the stations along the route were also blamed, because they allowed such a heavy train to continue even if they knew that its engines were not powerful enough. However the provisions for the train came straight from the Allied Command, so railway workers could not stop the train and change its composition. The Command itself organized a train to check the condition of the disaster, with staff equipped with oxygen masks, which recognized the actual development of abnormal amounts of toxic gases.

Ferrovie dello Stato Italiane declined all responsibility, claiming that in the complex end-of-war set up (where Italian authorities coexisted with the US command) they could not even immediately determine who had the responsibility for the management of one particular train. However the company could be blamed because at that time, despite the high demand on the route between Naples and Potenza, there was only one scheduled passenger train (train 8021), which left from Naples twice a week, on Wednesdays and Saturdays, which prompted an increase in illegal ridership on freight trains.

In attempt to prevent criticism, the Ministry of Treasury issued to the families of all identified victims the same compensation which was given for war victims (although it was paid more than 15 years afterwards).

Regulation changes 
After the disaster a limit of 350 tonnes was introduced on the entire line. In addition, for particularly heavy trains requiring two locomotives, a composition of an American diesel locomotive and an Italian steam locomotive was used in place of a double steam drive. Furthermore, at the south exit of the Armi tunnel a permanent guard post was established, which allowed trains to enter the gallery only when exhaust gases from previous trains had cleared.

The guard post remained in place until 1959, when all steam trains were banned from the line. The weight regulations were repealed in 1996, when the line was electrified.

In popular culture 
"Galleria dele Armi" - song by American musician Terry Allen from the album Human Remains (1996).
"The Black Market Express"  - episode about the Balvano train disaster from the documentary Disasters of the Century (2000), aired on Canadian network History.

See also

 Lists of rail accidents

References

Further reading
 
 

1944 in Italy
Railway accidents in 1944
Railway accidents and incidents in Italy
Tunnel disasters
Deaths from carbon monoxide poisoning
Accidents and incidents involving Ferrovie dello Stato Italiane
March 1944 events